Edoardo Catinali (born 16 August 1982 in Naples) is an Italian professional football player who plays for Serie D club A.S,D Puteolana 1902.

On 11 August 2012 he was suspended for 3 year and a half due to 2011 Italian football scandal.

References

External links
 Career summary by lega-calcio
 

1982 births
Living people
Italian footballers
Serie B players
Taranto F.C. 1927 players
S.S. Teramo Calcio players
F.C. Grosseto S.S.D. players
A.C. Perugia Calcio players
A.C. Ancona players
L'Aquila Calcio 1927 players
S.S. Ischia Isolaverde players
Piacenza Calcio 1919 players
Real Vicenza V.S. players
S.F. Aversa Normanna players
S.S. Racing Club Fondi players
Latina Calcio 1932 players
Serie C players
Serie D players
Association football midfielders
U.S. Castrovillari Calcio players